Buckfield may refer to:

 Buckfield, Maine, town in Oxford County, Maine, United States
 Buckfield, Nova Scotia, community in the Canadian province of Nova Scotia

People 
 Adam de Buckfield (ca. 1220–d. before 1294), English Franciscan philosopher
 Clare Buckfield (born 1976), English actress
 Julie Buckfield (born 1976), English actress
 Lin Buckfield, Australian television producer, journalist and musician
 Nick Buckfield (born 1973), English pole vaulter